The Way Home is a 2010 American television film directed and written by Lance W. Dreesen and starring Dean Cain and Pierce Gagnon.

Cast
Pierce Gagnon as Little Joe
Dean Cain as Randy Simpkins
Sonny Shroyer as Ed Walker

References

External links

2010 drama films
2010 television films
2010 films
American drama television films
2010s American films